Vini may refer to:

People
 Sebastiano Vini (1515-1602), Italian painter
 Vini Ciccarello (born 1947), Australian politician
 Vini (footballer) (born 1984), full name Vinicius Frasson, Brazilian football striker
 Vini Dantas (born 1989), Brazilian football player
 Vini Flores, Brazilian futsal player
 Vini Locatelli, Brazilian football player
 Vini Lopez
 Vini Paulista, Brazilian football player
 Vini Poncia
 Vini Reilly (born 1953), English musician
 Vini Vishwa Lal, Indian screenwriter
 Vini Vitharana (1928–2019), Sri Lankan linguist

Other
 Vini (bird), genus of birds in the family Psittaculidae
 Vini (letter), 6th letter of the three Georgian scripts